The Main road 4 is a west–east direction First class main road across the Alföld region of Hungary, that connects Budapest to the biggest eastern Hungarian cities: Szolnok, Debrecen, Nyíregyháza towards the border of Ukraine, facilitating access from the capital city of Hungary to the Ukrainian border. Most of the traffic was taken over by the M4 expressway until Püspökladány.

The road, as well as all other main roads in Hungary, is managed and maintained by Magyar Közút, state owned company.

Sources

See also

 Roads in Hungary
 Transport in Hungary

External links

 Hungarian Public Road Non-Profit Ltd. (Magyar Közút Nonprofit Zrt.)
 National Infrastructure Developer Ltd.

Main roads in Hungary
Pest County
Transport in Jász-Nagykun-Szolnok County
Hajdú-Bihar County
Szabolcs-Szatmár-Bereg County